Paraliptus is a genus of flies in the family Dolichopodidae. It contains only one species, Paraliptus mirabilis, and is found in Australia.

References

Hydrophorinae
Dolichopodidae genera
Diptera of Australasia
Monotypic Diptera genera
Taxa named by Mario Bezzi
Endemic fauna of Australia